The 1882 Kansas gubernatorial election was held on November 7, 1882. Democratic nominee George Washington Glick defeated incumbent Republican John St. John with 46.40% of the vote.

General election

Candidates
Major party candidates 
George Washington Glick, Democratic
John St. John, Republican

Other candidates
Charles L. Robinson, Greenback

Results

References

1882
Kansas
Gubernatorial